Seal Island, also known as Seal Rock, is an island in the Australian state of South Australia located in Encounter Bay off the south coast of Fleurieu Peninsula  approximately  south-east of Victor Harbor.  It is located with the boundaries of the following protected areas - the West Island Conservation Park and the Encounter Marine Park.

Description
The island is also known as Seal Rock.

Flora and fauna
As of 1996, Seal Island was observed as having no vegetation while the only vertebrate animals observed was a breeding colony of silver gulls.

History
The island's name is reported as suggesting the presence of an Australian sea lion or a New Zealand fur-seal colony on the island during the early 19th century.

Protected areas status
Since 7 June 1979, Seal Island has been located with the boundaries of the West Island Conservation Park.  Since 2012, the waters surrounding its shores are located within the boundaries of the Encounter Marine Park.

References

Islands of South Australia
Uninhabited islands of Australia
Encounter Bay